Gregg Bordowitz (born August 14, 1964) is a writer, artist, and activist currently working as a professor in the Video, New Media, and Animation department at The School of the Art Institute of Chicago.

Biography
Gregg Bordowitz was born August 14, 1964 in Brooklyn, NY. In 1982, Bordowitz began his academic career at the School of Visual Arts, then studied at the Whitney Museum Independent Study Program from 1985 to 1986, and at New York University from 1986 to 1987. In 1987, Bordowitz dropped out of school to become a full-time video artist, guerilla TV director, and activist with the direct action advocacy group ACT UP. During this time, Bordowitz was central to the formation of the notable video activist collective, Testing the Limits, who produced work documenting AIDS activism that were distributed through television, museums, schools, and community centers. He also wrote prolifically on the topic of AIDS activism, contributing heavily to the 1987 "AIDS: Cultural Analysis/Cultural Activism" of the well-respected academic journal October. In 1988, Gregg Bordowitz tested positive for HIV and, as a result, came out as a homosexual man to his mother and stepfather. He left Testing the Limits (now a self-sufficient non-profit entity) to focus on a more 'guerilla' approach to documenting AIDS activism. In 1988, he met video artist Jean Carlomusto at a demonstration partnered with her to produce the Gay Men's Health Crisis (GMHC) cable TV show Living With AIDS, which ran regularly until 1994. In 1989, he, along with numerous other video activists, formed DIVA (Damned Interfering Video Activists), a partner organization to ACT UP, dedicated to accurately documenting the protests organized by ACT UP and providing an alternative representation of the AIDS activist movement than the one presented by the mainstream media.

In 1993, filled with despair at the decline of AIDS activism as well as his own diminishing chances of survival, Bordowitz produced one of his most famous pieces, the documentary/montage Fast Trip, Long Drop. In this video, Bordowitz addresses the public's reaction to and representation of the AIDS epidemic as well as his own fears, insecurities, and struggles related to the disease. Fast Trip, Long Drop provides a pessimistic counterpoint to the flood of representations of people "Surviving and Thriving" with AIDS through a collage of documentary footage, staged parody, and vintage film clips. For the first time in an AIDS-related documentary, people with AIDS were shown addressing and coming to terms with the ever-present fact of their own mortality. As Bordowitz explains in his 1999 interview with the AIDS art forum Artery, "When I made "Fast Trip, Long Drop" I was tired of pretending for the sake of others that I would survive. I became preoccupied with the burdens that sick people bear on behalf of those around them who are well. I wanted to get a handle on despair and put it out there as a political problem. To be recognized and discussed. If we couldn't do this, then it all seemed like bullshit. I wanted an honest media produced in the interests of people living with AIDS." The film, along with many of his other works, has been shown in film festivals, museums, and on television ever since with extremely positive response.

From there, Bordowitz continued to address AIDS in his artwork, video work, and writing. He taught video art at the Academy of Fine Arts Vienna, Brown University, and School of the Art Institute of Chicago from 1995 to 2010, before being hired as a permanent professor at the School of the Art Institute of Chicago. His works have been shown at the Solomon R. Guggenheim Museum, the Whitney Museum of American Art, and the Museum of Modern Art, as well as numerous film festivals.

Videography
some aspects of a shared lifestyle (1986)
Fast Trip, Long Drop (1993)
A Cloud in Trousers (1995)
The Suicide (1996)
Habit (2001)

Bibliography
Drive: The AIDS Crisis Is Still Beginning (2002)
The AIDS Crisis Is Ridiculous and Other Writings 1986–2003 (2004)
Between Artists: Amy Sillman, Gregg Bordowitz (2007)
Volition (2009)
General Idea: Imagevirus (2010)

A History of Sexuality Volume One by Michel Foucault: An Opera
In 2009, Gregg Bordowitz began collaboration with artist Paul Chan an opera adaptation of Michel Foucault’s History of Sexuality. Though they envisioned the project as an impossible to complete, they were approached by Viennese museum curator Achim Hochdörfer, and asked to stage a performance at the MUMOK. In 2010, they staged a 6-man performance written and directed by Bordowitz.

References

External links
Gregg Bordowitz's Personal Web Page

Video Data Bank Profile
ACT UP Home Page
Gregg Bordowitz Video Interview 

1964 births
American activists
American video artists
American male writers
Living people
LGBT Jews
Jewish American artists
Jewish American writers
School of the Art Institute of Chicago faculty
American LGBT artists
American LGBT writers
LGBT people from New York (state)
Gay academics
Members of ACT UP
21st-century American Jews